List of volcanoes in Canada is an incomplete list of volcanoes found in Mainland Canada, in the Canadian islands and in Canadian waters. All but one province, Prince Edward Island, have at least one volcano.

Alberta

British Columbia

New Brunswick

Newfoundland and Labrador

Northwest Territories

Nova Scotia

Nunavut

Ontario

Quebec

Saskatchewan

Yukon

See also

 Outline of Canada
 Bibliography of Canada
 Index of Canada-related articles
 Volcanism of Canada
 Volcanism of Northern Canada
 Volcanism of Western Canada
 Volcanism of Eastern Canada
 List of Northern Cordilleran volcanoes
 List of mountains in Canada
 List of Cascade volcanoes

External links
 Catalogue of Canadian Volcanoes

 
Canada
Volcanoes
Volcanoes
Volcanoes